Jose Luis Munoz (born November 11, 1967 in Chicago, Illinois) is a retired Major League Baseball infielder. He played during one season at the major league level for the Chicago White Sox. He was drafted by the Los Angeles Dodgers in the 20th round of the 1987 amateur draft. Munoz played his first professional season with their Rookie league Gulf Coast Dodgers in 1987, and split his last season with the Chicago White Sox and their Triple-A affiliate, the Nashville Sounds, in 1996.

External links

1967 births
Living people
Albuquerque Dukes players
American expatriate baseball players in Mexico
Bakersfield Dodgers players
Baseball players from Chicago
Broncos de Reynosa players
Cafeteros de Córdoba players
Chicago White Sox players
Gulf Coast Dodgers players
Langosteros de Cancún players
Major League Baseball left fielders
Major League Baseball second basemen
Major League Baseball shortstops
Major League Baseball third basemen
Mexican League baseball left fielders
Mexican League baseball second basemen
Mexican League baseball shortstops
Mexican League baseball third basemen
Nashville Sounds players
Olmecas de Tabasco players
Pawtucket Red Sox players
Richmond Braves players
San Antonio Missions players
Vero Beach Dodgers players
American expatriate baseball players in Taiwan
Brother Elephants players